SFCG may refer to:

 Search for Common Ground, an international nonprofit organization whose mission is to transform the way the world deals with conflict, away from adversarial approaches toward cooperative solutions
 SFCG Co., Ltd., a subsidiary of KE Holdings and engaged in money-lending in Japan